Brygindara was a city in Rhodes island perhaps near to Lindos. Brygindis was the local eponym goddess or heroine and Brygindarios the citizen.

References

Ancient Rhodes
Cities in ancient Greece